The Indian Journal of Occupational and Environmental Medicine is an official peer-reviewed open-access medical journal published on behalf of the Indian Association of Occupational Health. The journal publishes articles on the subject of occupational and environmental medicine including epidemiology, ergonomics, carcinogenesis, biological monitoring, industrial hygiene, toxicology, applied psychology, and environmental chemistry. The journal is indexed by PubMed.

References

External links 
 

Open access journals
English-language journals
Triannual journals
Medknow Publications academic journals
Publications established in 1997
Occupational safety and health journals
Academic journals associated with learned and professional societies of India